Manneville-ès-Plains is a commune in the Seine-Maritime department in the Normandy region in northern France.

Geography
The commune's short northern border comprises huge chalk cliffs facing the English Channel.

Population

Places of interest
 The church of Notre-Dame, dating from the sixteenth century.
 A sixteenth century manorhouse.

See also
Communes of the Seine-Maritime department

References

Communes of Seine-Maritime